Naked Youth is a 1961 American drama film directed by John F. Schreyer. It stars Robert Hutton and Carol Ohmart.

The film is also known as Wild Youth.

Plot summary 

Two fugitives from a New Mexico prison farm, "Switch" and Frankie, encounter a 16-year-old farm girl, Donna, and go on the run together. After accepting a ride from a stranger, Rivas, when their car breaks down, the group encounters a drug dealer and murderer, Maddo, and his strung-out girlfriend, Madge who is addicted to heroin.

Cast 
Robert Hutton as Maddo
Carol Ohmart as Madge
Jan Brooks as Donna
Clancy Cooper as Erickson
Steve Rowland as Switch
John Goddard as Rivas
Robert Arthur as Frankie

Production 
It was filmed in Tucumcari, New Mexico. According to John Goddard, the cast stayed at a motel during the filming. He also said that it was originally titled Switchblade.

Release 
It was released on a double-bill with 48 Hours to Live (1960). It was later released on VHS by Rhino Home Video on November 19, 1987 and on DVD by Sinister Cinema.

References

External links 

1961 films
American crime drama films
1960s action films
American black-and-white films
1961 drama films
1960s English-language films
1960s American films